Saysomphone Phomvihane (born 14 December 1956 in Houaphanh Province) is a Laotian politician and member of the Lao People's Revolutionary Party (LPRP). He is the son of former LPRP General Secretary Kaysone Phomvihane and Thongvin Phomvihane. He served as Chairman of the Central Committee of the Lao Front for National Construction. He currently serves as President of the National Assembly.

He was elected to the LPRP Central Committee at the 5th National Congress, and to the LPRP Politburo at the 10th National Congress.

References

Specific

Bibliography
Books:
 

Living people
1956 births
Members of the 5th Central Committee of the Lao People's Revolutionary Party
Members of the 6th Central Committee of the Lao People's Revolutionary Party
Members of the 7th Central Committee of the Lao People's Revolutionary Party
Members of the 8th Central Committee of the Lao People's Revolutionary Party
Members of the 9th Central Committee of the Lao People's Revolutionary Party
Members of the 10th Central Committee of the Lao People's Revolutionary Party
Members of the 11th Central Committee of the Lao People's Revolutionary Party
Members of the 10th Politburo of the Lao People's Revolutionary Party
Members of the 11th Politburo of the Lao People's Revolutionary Party
Finance Ministers of Laos
Government ministers of Laos
Lao People's Revolutionary Party politicians
Place of birth missing (living people)
People from Houaphanh province